The Hayabusa class is a guided missile patrol boat class of the Japan Maritime Self-Defense Force. Six boats were built between 2002 and 2004.

The Japan Maritime Self-Defense Force initially built three hydrofoil missile boats of the PG 1-go class between 1993 and 1995. The Hayabusa class was designed to correct the issues that arose with the preceding class. After an incident off the Noto Peninsula involving a North Korean spy ship, two ships of the class were included in the 1999 fiscal year plan.

Outline

Hull
The boat's displacement was enlarged to four times that of the PG 1-go class to improve seaworthiness. The maximum speed was increased to improve the ability to intercept ships; however, the speed increase proved to be difficult to implement.

Both double-hull and single-hull designs were considered; the single-hull design was selected for reasons of hull strength and seaworthiness.  The hull is long and narrow with a V-shaped bottom, allowing for a high hull speed and improved high-speed stability.

Stealth characteristics were incorporated. The slope of the superstructure, designed to minimize direct radar reflection, was chosen using computer simulation of the radar cross section. The tripod mast and 76 mm gun also have stealth features.

Propulsion

Three LM500-G07 gas turbine engines, built under license from General Electric by Ishikawajima-Harima, provide the main propulsion.

Armament

The main armament is a pair of SSM-1B ship-to-ship missile twin launchers installed in the stern and an Otobreda 76 mm gun on the front deck. Additionally, two 12.7 mm M2 machine guns are installed on the back of the bridge.

The weapons systems for the Hayabusa class is controlled by the OYQ-8B Tactical Data Processing System. It uses a smaller AN/UYK-44 computer but is vastly superior to the previous generation AN/UYK-20. Also it is capable of supporting Link 11 data link, which the previous OYQ-5 and UYK-20 system was not able to. As a result, it is now able to provide supporting data to other ships and aircraft. This enhances offensive and defensive capability as they can now feed data into the larger Maritime Operation Force System of the Self Defense Forces.

List of ships

References

External links

 Naval Institute Guide to Combat Fleets of the World entry
 GlobalSecurity.org entry

Missile boat classes
Patrol vessels of the Japan Maritime Self-Defense Force
Ships built in Japan